Paterson Lake is a lake located on Vancouver Island east of Salmon River, south west of Brewster Lake.

See also
List of lakes of British Columbia

References

Alberni Valley
Lakes of Vancouver Island
Sayward Land District